Xaviera Dessire Morales Almanza (born 22 September 1988) is a Nicaraguan footballer who plays as a defender for the Nicaragua women's national team.

Club career
Morales has played for UNAN Managua in Nicaragua.

International career
Morales capped for Nicaragua at senior level during the 2010 CONCACAF Women's World Cup Qualifying qualification, two Central American and Caribbean Games editions (2010 and 2014), the 2012 CONCACAF Women's Olympic Qualifying Tournament qualification and the 2013 Central American Games.

References 

1988 births
Living people
Nicaraguan women's footballers
Women's association football defenders
Nicaragua women's international footballers
Central American Games silver medalists for Nicaragua
Central American Games medalists in football